Päevaleht was a daily newspaper published in Estonia from 1990 to 1995.

History and profile
On 1 February 1990, the newspaper Noorte Hääl (published between 1940–1941 and 1944–1990) was renamed to Päevaleht.

The last issue was published on 4 June 1995. After that the newspapers Hommikuleht, Päevaleht and Rahva Hääl were merged to form a daily named Eesti Päevaleht.

See also
 Päevaleht (1905)
 Eesti Päevaleht

References

1990 establishments in Estonia
1995 disestablishments in Estonia
Defunct newspapers published in Estonia
Publications established in 1990
Publications disestablished in 1995